The 1907–08 season was Sport Lisboa e Benfica's third season in existence and the club's second competitive season, still under the name Sport Lisboa.

Campeonato de Lisboa

Table

Matches

Player statistics

|}

Notes

References

 

S.L. Benfica seasons
Sport Lisboa season
Sport Lisboa season
1907–08 in Portuguese football